Suresh Chandra Mishra (1903 – 30 March 1993), also known as Pandit Suresh Chandra Mishra, was an Indian politician and independence activist who served as a member of First Lok Sabha from 1952 to 1957 for the Monghyr constituency in Bihar. In 1920 Mishra had participated in the Non-cooperation movement, launched by Mahatma Gandhi, aimed at obtaining full independence from the British rule in the country.

Early life
Mishra was originally an agriculturist by profession, and a Social worker. He authored many publications in Hindi.

Death
Mishra died on 30 March 1993 at the age of 90 in Monghyr, Bihar.

References 

1903 births
1993 deaths
Date of death missing
India MPs 1952–1957
Indian independence activists
People from Bihar
Indian politicians